Absalyamovo (Äbsäläm) is a rural locality (a village) in Urgalinsky Selsoviet of Belokataysky District, Bashkortostan, Russia. The population was 244 as of 2010. There are 2 streets.

Geography 
Absalyamovo is located 49 km southeast of Novobelokatay (the district's administrative centre) by road. Urgala is the nearest rural locality.

References 

Rural localities in Belokataysky District